Lawrence Elveden (alias Cattaneo) (1512–1552) was the joint first MP for Petersfield.

References

1512 births
1552 deaths
English MPs 1547–1552